Kashinsky (masculine), Kashinskaya (feminine), or Kashinskoye (neuter) may refer to:
Kashinsky District, a district of Tver Oblast, Russia
Kashinsky (family), a Tver princely family of Rurikid stock
Kashinskoye, a rural locality (a village) in Vologda Oblast, Russia